Arch Hall Jr. (born December 2, 1943) is an American former actor.

Early career 
Born in Van Nuys, California, Hall began his career as a teen actor and musician, appearing in a number of early 1960s films that were all produced by his father, Arch Hall Sr. Most of Hall Jr.'s films featured his particular musical abilities, a teenager's tenor voice and guitar riffs played with swamp blues inflection. Hall was also the frontman for the rock n' roll combo Arch Hall Jr. and the Archers. The band, formed with high school friend Alan O'Day (who later wrote No. 1 pop hits in the 1970s) played Sunset Strip clubs such as the Whisky a Go Go and Pandora's Box.

For the most part, the films produced by the Halls and their associates, which at one point included cult director Ray Dennis Steckler, are considered B-movies. Hall's roles ranged from dunebuggy-driving teenager to a rock n' roll singing spy in a white dinner jacket. It is perhaps Hall's second movie, Eegah (1962), which has won him the most recognition, due in part to the television show Mystery Science Theater 3000 featuring the movie in a 1993 episode, and the late night comedy horror series  Elvira's Movie Macabre.  In The Sadist (1963), Hall portrayed a psychopathic killer based in part on teenage murderer Charles Starkweather.

Later career 
After appearing in his last film in 1965, Hall became an airline pilot (his father had flown with the Army Air Force during the Second World War). In 1967, he went to work for cargo carrier Flying Tiger Airlines as an apprentice co-pilot on the L-1049H, and eventually became a captain flying the Boeing 747. In 1989, Flying Tiger was purchased by FedEx and Hall flew the DC-10 until he retired in 2003. He later flew for a private company with businesses in the U.S. and Japan.

Hall wrote the novel Apsara Jet, which was published in 2001 under the pen name Nicolas Merriweather (a name often used by his father). The book draws on Hall's knowledge of both commercial airlines and Southeast Asia in telling the story of a Vietnam War vet who gets involved in the illegal drug trade.

A career-spanning 51-page interview with Hall appears in the book Earth vs. the Sci-Fi Filmmakers (McFarland & Co., 2005) by Tom Weaver. Hall's anthology, Wild Guitar, was released on Norton Records. The anthology, with liner notes and biography, collects the original '60s output of Arch Hall Jr. and the Archers, much of which was unreleased at the time.

Filmography

Discography 
 (2005) Wild Guitar — recording as Arch Hall Jr. and the Archers
 (1959) Monkey in My Hat Band / Konga Joe — recording as Arch Hall Jr.

Books 
 (2001) Apsara Jet — ; writing as Nicolas Merriweather

References

External links 
 
 

1943 births
Living people
Male actors from California
American male writers
American aviators
American male film actors
American tenors
American rock singers
American male screenwriters
People from Van Nuys, Los Angeles
Guitarists from California
American male guitarists
Commercial aviators
20th-century American guitarists
Rock and roll musicians
Screenwriters from California
20th-century American male musicians